Peter M. Fesler is a United States Air Force major general who served as the deputy director of operations of the North American Aerospace Defense Command from July 2018 to August 2021.

Fesler retired effective 1 November 2021.

References

Living people
Place of birth missing (living people)
Recipients of the Defense Superior Service Medal
Recipients of the Legion of Merit
United States Air Force generals
Year of birth missing (living people)